Mikkilineni Radhakrishna Murthy (7 July 1914 - 23 February 2011) was an Indian actor and thespian known for his works predominantly in Telugu cinema. He was the founder of the theater group Praja Natya Mandali. He has received the honorary Kalaprapoorna from Andhra University, for his contributions towards Telugu theater and cinema.

Early life and career
He was born in Kolavennu village, Krishna District of Andhra Pradesh. Before entering into theater, he studied Diploma in Veterinary Science. He started his film career with the 1949 film Deeksha directed by K. S. Prakash Rao. He has acted in nearly 350 feature films and was known for his association with N. T. Rama Rao in near 150 films and in almost all the B. Vittalacharya movies.

Awards
Nandi Awards
Filmfare Awards South

Other honors
Rashtrapati Award from Govt of India (1965)
Kalaprapoorna from Andhra University (1965)

Selected filmography

Actor

1996 Sri Krishnarjuna Vijayam
1994 Bhairava Dweepam 
1993 Srinatha Kavi Sarvabhowmudu
1991 Brahmarshi Vishwamitra
1987 Dharmapatni
1987 Sankharavam
1986 Aakrandana as Judge
1985 Aggiraju 
1984 Naagu
1984 Rustum
1984 Tandava Krishnudu
1983 Chattaniki Veyi Kallu
1983 Puli Bebbuli
1983 Bezawada Bebbuli
1983 Nijam Chepite Nerama as Rajasekhara Rao
1982 Bobbili Puli
1982 Prema Nakshatram
1981 Jathagadu
1980 Kiladi Krishnudu as Ramachandra Rao
1980 Chuttalunnaru Jagratha
1980 Sita Ramulu
1980 Mama Allulla Saval
1980 Punnami Naagu
1980 Ram Robert Rahim
1979 Sri Madvirata Parvam
1979 Gandharva Kanya 
1979 Hema Hemeelu
1978 Dudu Basavanna as Village Head
1978 Sati Savitri
1978 Sri Rama Raksha
1977 Daana Veera Soora Karna 
1977 Chiranjeevi Rambabu as Dharmaiah
1976 Sita Swayamvar 
1976 Seeta Kalyanam
1974 Galipatalu
1973 Minor Babu  
1973 Desoddharakulu
1973 Palletoori Chinnodu
1973 Dabbuki Lokam Dasoham
1972 Badi Panthulu
1972 Pandanti Kapuram
1972 Praja Nayakudu
1972 Sri Krishna Satya
1972 Bala Mitrula Katha
1972 Bala Bharatam
1971 Pavitra Hrudayalu
1971 Adrusta Jathakudu
1971 Debbaku tha Dongala Mutha
1971 Sisindri Chittibabu  
1971 Sampoorna Ramayanam 
1970 Balaraju Katha 
1969 Kathanayakudu
1969 Sipayi Chinnayya
1969 Nindu Hrudayalu
1969 Ekaveera
1969 Varakatnam
1969 Gandikota Rahasyam
1969 Aggi Veerudu
1969 Kadaladu Vadaladu
1968 Devakanya 
1968 Manchi Kutumbam
1968 Baghdad Gaja Donga
1968 Kalisochina Adrushtam
1966 Palnati Yuddham 
1966 Adugu Jaadalu
1966 Srikakula Andhra Maha Vishnu Katha
1966 Pidugu Ramudu
1965 Veerabhimanyu
1965 Prameelarjuneeyam
1965 Antastulu 
1965 C.I.D. 
1965 Pandava Vanavasam 
1964 Babruvahana 
1964 Manchi Manishi as Veerayya
1964 Desa Drohulu
1964 Ramudu Bheemudu
1964 Pooja Phalam 
1964 Gudi Gantalu
1963 Somavara Vrata Mahatyam
1963 Nartanasala 
1963 Aapta Mitrulu
1963 Tirupathamma Katha 
1963 Lakshadhikari 
1963 Bandipotu as Veeranayaka
1963 Paruvu Prathishta
1963 Sri Krishnarjuna Yuddhamu 
1962 Kula Gotralu 
1962 Mahamantri Timmarasu 
1962 Gundamma Katha
1962 Dakshayagnam
1962 Gulebakavali Katha 
1961 Usha Parinayam
1961 Jagadeka Veeruni Katha 
1961 Sita Rama Kalyanam
1960 Anna Chellelu as Yerranna
1960 Renukadevi Mahatyam 
1960 Pillalu Techina Challani Rajyam
1958 Anna Thammudu
1958 Appu Chesi Pappu Koodu 
1957 Sarangadhara 
1957 Mayabazar 
1956 Tenali Ramakrishna
1955 Santhanam 
1954 Menarikam 
1954 Parivartana 
1953 Kanna Talli 
1953 Puttillu 
1952 Palletooru 
1948 Deeksha

References

Male actors from Andhra Pradesh
Telugu male actors
Filmfare Awards South winners
Nandi Award winners
1914 births
2011 deaths
People from Krishna district
20th-century Indian male actors
Indian male film actors
Male actors in Telugu cinema